The Karabakh Range or Artsakh range is a mountain range of Lesser Caucasus. It is an arc stretching from North to South-East from Tartar river to Aras River. The Hakari River (left tributary of the Aras) separates it from the Karabakh Plateau. The highest point is Mount Kirs (2725 m).

Gallery

References

Mountain ranges of the Caucasus
Mountain ranges of Armenia
Mountain ranges of Azerbaijan
Mountain ranges of the Republic of Artsakh